Diego Thomas de Santuchos (1549–1624) was a Spanish Nobleman, Conquistador of Asunción and Santa Fe during the Viceroyalty of Peru.

Biography 

Diego Thomas de Santuchos was born in Zaragoza, was married to Catalina Correa de Santa Ana (born in Andalucia). Santuchos and his wife arrived at the Rio de la Plata in the expedition of Juan Ortiz de Zárate.
 
Diego Tómas de Santuchos, was Lieutenant governor of Santa Fe, died on October 29, 1624.

References

External links 
www.santafe.gov.ar

1549 births
1624 deaths
People from Santa Fe, Argentina
People from Zaragoza
Spanish colonial governors and administrators
16th-century explorers
Explorers of Argentina